Aliibacillus  is a Gram-positive, moderately thermophilic, heterotrophic, rod-shaped and motile genus of bacteria from the family of Bacillaceae with one known species (Aidingibacillus halophilus).

References

Bacillaceae
Bacteria genera
Monotypic bacteria genera
Bacteria described in 2019